Allison Joy Milner (1 May 1983 Melbourne, Australia - 12 August 2019 Melbourne, Australia) was a social epidemiologist specializing in workplace mental health.

Milner was Deputy Head of the Disability and Health Unit at the Centre for Health Equity, Melbourne School of Population and Global Health (MSPGH) at the University of Melbourne. She earned a doctor of philosophy from the Griffith University's Australian Institute for Suicide Research and Prevention in Brisbane and a masters of epidemiology from the University of Melbourne.

She was killed by a falling tree in Princes Park.

References

External links

1983 births
2019 deaths
Accidental deaths in Victoria (Australia)
Australian women epidemiologists
Griffith University alumni
Scientists from Melbourne
University of Melbourne alumni
Academic staff of the University of Melbourne